Great Lake Swimmers is the debut studio album by the Canadian folk rock band Great Lake Swimmers.

The album was recorded over several months in an abandoned grain silo in Dekker's hometown of Wainfleet, Ontario.

Led by songwriter-vocalist Tony Dekker, their haunting sound finds its roots in vintage folk and alt-country colourings, shaped by accordion and piano, lap steel and acoustic guitar, with a voice that seems to come from the walls.

The record was issued by weewerk in March 2003, in Europe by Fargo Records in March 2004, and Misra in the United States in April 2005.

Track listing
 "Moving Pictures, Silent Films" - 5:31
 "The Man with No Skin" - 5:26
 "Moving, Shaking" - 5:22
 "Merge, A Vessel, A Harbour" - 4:44
 "I Will Never See the Sun" - 3:35
 "This Is Not Like Home" - 3:45
 "The Animals of the World" - 5:31
 "Faithful Night, Listening" - 4:08
 "Three Days at Sea (Three Lost Years)" - 3:52
 "Great Lake Swimmers" - 6:45

References

2003 debut albums
Great Lake Swimmers albums